The Carl Mackley Houses, also originally known as Juniata Park Housing, is a private apartment complex in the Juniata neighborhood of Philadelphia, Pennsylvania. Built in 1933–1934 as single-family apartments, it opened in 1935. The project was sponsored by the American Federation of Full-Fashioned Hosiery Workers, with financing by the Housing Division of the Public Works Administration, of which it was the first funded project. The complex was named for a striking hosiery worker killed by non-union workers during the H.C. Aberle Company strike in 1930.

The complex was designed in the International Style by Oscar Stonorov and Alfred Kastner. Since neither designer was a registered architect, they enlisted Philadelphia architect William Pope Barney (1890–1970) as the architect of record.

The five-building complex covers an entire city block, bounded by Castor Avenue, Bristol, M, and Cayuga Streets. Four of the buildings, of three stories, each contain 71 one-, two-, and three-bedroom apartments, in six different layouts, above underground garages. The fifth building, originally a community center, now houses a laundry. The complex originally featured a swimming pool and wading pool, since filled in, and is now operated by private investors as rental apartments.

The complex was added to the Philadelphia Register of Historic Places on June 3, 1982, and the National Register of Historic Places in 1998. It won a Landmark Building Award from the American Institute of Architects in 2000.

References

External links
Carl Mackley Apartments at the National Building Museum
Carl Mackley Apartment Development at Philadelphia Architects and Buildings
Application to the National Register of Historic Places

Residential buildings on the National Register of Historic Places in Philadelphia
New Deal in Pennsylvania
Philadelphia Register of Historic Places
Public housing in Philadelphia
International style architecture in Pennsylvania
Residential buildings completed in 1934
Northeast Philadelphia
1934 establishments in Pennsylvania